Greenfield is a large village in Highland and Ross counties, Ohio, United States. As of the 2010 census, the population was 4,639. Since the population declined to under 5,000, the Census Bureau may still call it a city; but by Ohio's laws, it is technically deemed a village. Greenfield is most well known because of its rich history, including its community members helping in the underground railroad, new industries, and McClain High School.

History
Greenfield was named for its rural appearance.

General Duncan McArthur founded the town in 1799. Greenfield has had many innovators, such as Edward Lee McClain who was well known for his detachable horse collar. The American Pad and Textile Company was created by McClain later in life. This company provided job opportunities for Greenfield, and created products such as the life vest used in World War II. His memory will never be forgotten by Greenfield however because he donated a great gift to the town. Edward Lee McClain High School which opened on September 23, 1915, was named after him. People who wished to attend paid a fee of 15 cents for admission. Located in the center of town and serving as a focal point for the town, the school has many sculptures, paintings and murals, making it a well known school in Ohio. It was the first school in Ohio to have an indoor swimming pool, which is still there today, with minor construction revisions.

The first African American owned car company was first founded in Greenfield. The C.R. Patterson and Sons company started as a horse-drawn buggy company but later produced cars, buses, and trucks. C.R. Patterson, alongside J.P. Lowe, moved to Greenfield where they founded the car company. The C.R. Patterson and Sons car company provided Greenfield schools buses to conduct routes. Other industries in Greenfield include Ruckers Quarry, which day and night quarried stone such as limestone on a large scale for the Cincinnati market. Another industry was Harps Manufacturing which was most well known for the Never-fail Oil Can, which was originally designed by Eugene Arnott but then perfected by Harp's Manufacturing.

Most of Greenfield's settlers moved from their comfortable homes in the founding states to unfamiliar territory, Ohio, because they were against slavery. In April 1833, the Abolition Society of Paint Valley was founded. Its main effort was to educate and do missionary work in the stance of ending slavery. The Abolition Society of Paint Valley was later disbanded but was quickly re-organized as the Greenfield Antislavery Society. Records become thin due to the large number of citizens helping African Americans to gain freedom.  Greenfield played a major part in the ending of slavery. Former slaves passed through the area on their way to Canada during the operation of the Underground Railroad with much help from Greenfield's community members.

As of today, much of Greenfield's rich history has gone; many storefronts are vacant where prominent businesses once stood. However, the Travellers' Rest remains, along with other buildings such as the post office and the school. In 1988, the 29.5-mile railroad line connecting the city to the national rail network was scheduled to be decommissioned, but Greenfield bought it for $2.4 million and kept it operational in order to retain a transportation outlet for the local manufacturing industry. This also made the city the smallest in the U.S. to own its own rail line.

Historic sites
Much of Greenfield's early history concentrates on the Travellers' Rest Inn at the eastern end of Jefferson Street. Constructed in 1812, it was the village's first stone building. It also served as its first post office, and was the space for its first doctor's office.  Now operated as a museum, the inn is listed on the National Register of Historic Places. The Samuel Smith House and Tannery is also listed on the National Register.

Geography
Greenfield is located almost entirely in Highland County.

Climate
Greenfield receives an annual average of 38 inches of rain, and averages 25 inches of snow. Both averages are very similar to those of the United States. Greenfield averages 173 sunny days and 128 rainy days. The average high temperature in July is 84 degrees and the average low in January is 20.6 degrees.

Demographics

2012
The most recent calculations of population indicate that the total population is equal to 4,562, population has gone down 7 percent since 2000. The estimated median household income in 2012 was $26,944; for the state of Ohio the estimated median household income was $46,829.

2010 census
As of the census of 2010, there were 4,639 people, 1,829 households, and 1,148 families residing in the city. The racial makeup of the city was 95.9% White, 1.7% African American, 0.1% Native American, 0.2% Asian, 0.3% from other races, and 1.7% from two or more races. Hispanic or Latino people of any race were 0.8% of the population.

There were 1,829 households, of which 33.7% had children under the age of 18 living with them, 38.4% were married couples living together, 17.8% had a female householder with no husband present, 6.5% had a male householder with no wife present, and 37.2% were non-families. 32.1% of all households were made up of individuals, and 15% had someone living alone who was 65 years of age or older. The average household size was 2.47 and the average family size was 3.07.

The median age in the city was 37.1 years. 25.9% of residents were under the age of 18; 8.7% were between the ages of 18 and 24; 25.3% were from 25 to 44; 24.4% were from 45 to 64; and 15.8% were 65 years of age or older. The gender makeup of the city was 47.5% male and 52.5% female.

2000 census
As of the census of 2000, there were 4,906 people, 1,955 households, and 1,253 families residing in the village. The population density was 2,536.3 people per square mile (981.5/km2). There were 2,099 housing units at an average density of 1,085.1 per square mile (419.9/km2). The racial makeup of the village was 95.78% White, 2.20% African American, 0.08% Native American, 1.28% Asian, 0.12% Pacific Islander, 0.33% from other races, and 1.41% from two or more races. Hispanic or Latino people of any race were 0.69% of the population.

There were 1,955 households, out of which 31.4% had children under the age of 18 living with them, 44.3% were married couples living together, 15.3% had a female householder with no husband present, and 35.9% were non-families. 30.9% of all households were made up of individuals, and 15.4% had someone living alone who was 65 years of age or older. The average household size was 2.44 and the average family size was 3.04.

In the village, the population was spread out, with 26.4% under the age of 18, 9.6% from 18 to 24, 26.2% from 25 to 44, 21.3% from 45 to 64, and 16.6% who were 65 years of age or older. The median age was 36 years. For every 100 females, there were 85.6 males. For every 100 females age 18 and over, there were 81.8 males.

The median income for a household in the village was $30,805, and the median income for a family was $36,952. Males had a median income of $32,156 versus $21,352 for females. The per capita income for the village was $14,306. About 12.3% of families and 15.1% of the population were below the poverty line, including 16.5% of those under age 18 and 13.6% of those age 65 or over.

Education
Greenfield Exempted Village Schools operates three elementary schools (Rainsboro, Buckskin, and Greenfield Elementary), one middle school, and McClain High School.

Greenfield has a public library, a branch of the Highland County District Library.

Government
As of 2018, Greenfield's village council consists of Phil Clyburn, Amie Ernst, Brenda Losey, and Dr. Eric Borsini.

Other officials include City Manager Todd Wilkin, Finance Director Gary Lewis, Police Chief Jeremiah Oyer, Law Director Hannah Bivens, and Clerk of Council Sherry Parker.

Notable people
 Samuel McChord Crothers, essayist and Unitarian divine
 Otway Curry, poet and legislator
 David T. Daniels, Director of the Ohio Department of Agriculture
 Don Grate, professional baseball and basketball player
 Noble Edward Irwin, United States Navy rear admiral
 Wenona Marlin, suffragist
 Brad Martin, country music artist
 David Noggle, jurist
Charles Richard Patterson (1833 – 1910), African-American carriage manufacturer, entrepreneur and civil rights activist.
 Frederick Patterson (1871 – 1932), first African-American to play football for the Ohio State University Buckeyes, the first African-American automobile manufacturer.
 Johnny Paycheck, country singer

Gallery

References

 
Villages in Ohio
Villages in Highland County, Ohio
Villages in Ross County, Ohio